Tatyana Franck (born in Geneva on 12 May 1984) is the director of the Musée de l'Élysée in Lausanne. She is also the president of the French Institute Alliance Française.

Education
In 2006, Franck obtained a double degree in Art History and Law from the Sorbonne Nouvelle University Paris 3 in Paris. In 2007, she obtained a master's degree in Business Law and in 2008 a degree in Art Market Law from the University of Lyon.

Biography
Franck is a former alpine skier. She retired from competition following a torn cruciate ligament.

Between 2006 and 2015, she directed the Claude Picasso archives in Paris and Geneva. In particular, she curated the exhibition "Picasso at Work".

References

Swiss curators
Swiss art curators
1984 births
Living people
University of Lyon alumni